The Obama Diaries is a book written by Laura Ingraham and published by Simon & Schuster on July 13, 2010.  It reached the number 1 position on the New York Times Best Seller list published August 1, 2010, staying at number 2 for approximately one month after that.

Fiction or non-fiction
Whether to list the book as fiction or non-fiction was disputed.  The New York Times and USA Today classified it as non-fiction on their Best Seller list, but made the clear distinction that it is satire, and therefore more spurious than fact.

References

External links
 

2010 non-fiction books
American political satire
Books about Barack Obama
Political satire books
Threshold Editions books